Scottish military units may refer to:

 units in former Scottish armies
 Scottish units in former British armies, including:
 The Lowland Brigade
 The Highland Brigage
 Scottish units in the present structure of the British Army, including:
 Scottish Division
 Royal Regiment of Scotland
 Royal Highland Fusiliers

See also
 Scottish units of measurement